Widdows Island is a small island in the Sacramento–San Joaquin River Delta along the Old River distributary of the San Joaquin River. It is part of San Joaquin County, California. It appears on USGS maps of the area as dry land up to 2018; the latest 2021 topographic map shows the island now mostly flooded, with the old levee surrounding it still above water.

References

Islands of San Joaquin County, California
Islands of the Sacramento–San Joaquin River Delta
Islands of Northern California